Viarigi is a comune (municipality) in the Province of Asti in the Italian region Piedmont, located about  east of Turin and about  northeast of Asti.  
Viarigi borders the following municipalities: Altavilla Monferrato, Felizzano, Montemagno, Quattordio, and Refrancore.

References

Cities and towns in Piedmont